Deep Dive Dubai is a  deep diving pool in Dubai. Containing  of fresh water, it is the deepest swimming pool in the world. The structure has an area designed to resemble a ruined, sunken city, with walls, furnished rooms and a sunken car, and can also be used as an underwater film studio. The venue opened in July 2021.

References

External links
 

2021 establishments in the United Arab Emirates
Swimming pools
Swimming venues in the United Arab Emirates
Underwater diving sites in the United Arab Emirates